The Southern Limestone Alps, also called the Southern Calcareous Alps, are the ranges of the Eastern Alps south of the Central Eastern Alps mainly located in northern Italy and the adjacent lands of Austria and Slovenia. The distinction from the Central Alps, where the higher peaks are located, is based on differences in geological composition. The Southern Limestone Alps extend from the Sobretta-Gavia range in Lombardy in the west to the Pohorje in Slovenia in the east.

Alpine Club classification

Ranges of the Southern Limestone Alps according to the Alpine Club classification (from east to west):

 Pohorje (1)
 Kamnik–Savinja Alps (2)
 Karawanks (3)
 Julian Alps (4)
 Gailtal Alps (5)
 Carnic Alps (6)
 Southern Carnic Alps (7)
 Dolomites (8)
 Fiemme Mountains (9)
 Vicentine Alps (10)
 Nonsberg Group (11)
 Brenta Group (12) 
 Garda Mountains (13)
 Ortler Alps (14)
 Adamello-Presanella Alps (15)
 Sobretta-Gavia Group (16)

Physiography
The Southern Alps are a distinct physiographic section of the larger Alps province, which in turn is part of the larger Alpine System physiographic division.

See also 

 Geography of the Alps
 Limestone Alps
 Northern Limestone Alps
 List of mountain groups in the Alpine Club classification of the Eastern Alps

References

External links

 

Mountain ranges of the Alps
Mountain ranges of Austria
Mountain ranges of Italy
Mountain ranges of Slovenia
Mountain ranges of Switzerland
Physiographic sections